The General Tire 100 at The Glen is an ARCA Menards Series race held annually at Watkins Glen International, on the  road course. It was previously a part of the NASCAR East Series schedule until 2020 when the series was merged with ARCA and was moved to the ARCA Menards Series schedule.

History
The NASCAR Busch North Series had run at Watkins Glen from 1993 until 2004. The series, now known as the NASCAR Camping World East Series, returned to track four years later in 2008 and 2009, but the race was removed from the schedule again after that. However, after a five-year absence, the East Series returned to the Glen once again in 2014. After the unification of NASCAR's East (and West) Series and the ARCA Menards Series, the race moved to the ARCA Menards Series schedule starting in 2020. The race also became a part of the ARCA Menards Series Sioux Chief Showdown, a series of ten races within the season which features teams and drivers from the ARCA Menards Series East (the renamed NASCAR K&N Pro Series East) and ARCA Menards Series West (the renamed NASCAR K&N Pro Series West) as well competing for an additional championship.

In 2001, the ARCA Racing Series had their own race at Watkins Glen, which was won by John Finger. It was the only race they ran there before their merger with NASCAR.

The 2020 race ended up being cancelled and moved to the Daytona Road Course due to the COVID-19 pandemic. The race there was held on the same day (Saturday, August 14), that the Watkins Glen race would have been on.

Past winners

 1999: Race shortened due to time constraints.
 2000, 2003 and 2019: Race shortened due to rain.
 1997, 2002, 2014 and 2017: Race extended due to a NASCAR Overtime finish.

ARCA Racing Series standalone race winner

References

External links
 
 Watkins Glen on NASCAR Home Tracks

1957 establishments in New York (state)
NASCAR races at Watkins Glen International
ARCA Menards Series East
ARCA Menards Series races
Motorsport in New York (state)